Khok Khli railway station is a railway station located in Nong Ri Subdistrict, Lam Sonthi District, Lopburi Province.

References 

Railway stations in Thailand
Lopburi province